Macomb is the name of several places in the United States of America:

 Macomb, Illinois
 Macomb County, Michigan
 Macomb Township, Michigan
 Macomb, Missouri
 Macomb, New York
 Macomb's Purchase, New York
 Macomb, Oklahoma

See also
 McComb (disambiguation)